Cisco Embedded Event Manager (EEM)  is a feature included in Cisco's IOS operating system (and some other Cisco OSes such as IOS-XR, IOS-XE, and NX-OS) that allow programmability and automation capabilities inside the device. EEM allows the behavior of a Cisco device to adapt to specific user requirements by allowing scripting, thresholding, proactive actions, data collection and event management inside the Cisco device itself. Using EEM, problems can be identified and resolved automatically in advance by setting event triggers (called Event Detectors) to watch for specific types of situations or thresholds, or run a set of actions periodically.

Cisco embedded management family
EEM is a member of a family of embedded management technologies in Cisco IOS including SNMP, NetFlow, IP SLA, Web Services Management Agent, Syslog, ESM (Embedded Syslog Manager), ERM (Embedded Resource Manager), EMM (Embedded Menu Manager), Tcl and Service Diagnostics.

When a situation is detected by EEM, it uses policies to invoke actions based on the type of event and the configured policy. EEM currently supports three different types of programming actions (see Programming Capabilities below).

About
With EEM, users can capture complex network events and run sophisticated programs on Cisco devices. The version of EEM on most Cisco devices is version 2.1, or version is 3.0 which was introduced in IOS 12.4(22)T. The latest version is version 4.0, which was released November 2011, targeting IOS releases 12.2SR, 12.2SB, 12.4, and 12.4T, 15.0M, 12.2SG, 12.2SE, Cisco IOS XE, and future versions. EEM consists of three areas; event detectors, policies and programming languages.

Event detectors
The brains of EEM are event detectors. These event detectors are built-in capabilities to watch for specific situations or conditions. Newer versions of EEM have more event detectors than older ones.

Typical of EEM Event Detectors:
 SNMP
 OIR (Online Insertion and Removal)
 CLI Command Line Interface
 Syslog
 XML-RPC
 IP SLAs
 NetFlow
 Application specific event
 Config change
 Interface counters
 Redundancy framework
 SNMP notification (i.e. when the device receives a trap)
 Resource
 Timer
 Timer subscriber
 IOS Process
 Counter
 GOLD (Generic OnLine Diagnostics)
 Environmental
 Routing
 Enhanced Object Tracking (EOT)
 None (launch the event manually)

Policies
Policies determine what is run when an event is detected. Policies save users from having to enumerate an action for every possible event.

Programming capabilities
EEM supports three methods of programmability and scripting.
 Applets - these allow CLI to be run when a certain set of conditions occurs
 Tcl - when more complex programs need to be built, EEM supports Tcl (Tool Command Language) development
 IOS.sh - newer versions of IOS support IOS.sh (IOS shell) macros similar to Linux bash shell

Version comparison

Example
There are four steps to setting up an EEM system. In this example, we will get an email of the status of the system when the HSRP state changes. This example defines an applet action rather than Tcl.

  <-- define the environment variable
  <-- define the address to which email will be sent
  <-- define the address from which the email will be sent
  <-- set up the policy
  <-- define the trigger
  <-- obtain the current device hostname and place it in the $_info_routername variable
  <-- actions such as writing to flash, making config changes, etc. require enable privilege
  <-- write some debugging output to flash
  <-- more debugging output
  <-- send an email with the result of the last CLI command in the body of the message

Network management software and tools support
Network management Software utilizing EEM include:
 CiscoWorks and CiscoWorks LMS
 Progrizon: EEM Deployment Application Suite and EEM Policy Builder
 Davra Networks: EEM Solutions

References

Further reading

External links
 EEM Data Sheet
 Go EEM
 EEM Scripting Community
 Embedded Event Manager Configuration Guide

EEM-Based Solution Development
 Progrizon, Inc. EEM Solution Development and Consulting

Training
 Progrizon, Inc. Training
 Cisco IOS Automation and Customization (CIOSC)
 Advanced IOS Customization using EEM (ACEEM)
 

Cisco Systems